Westside Secondary School is a public high school located in Orangeville, Ontario, Canada that opened on November 25, 1999. The current population is 800 students.

See also
List of high schools in Ontario

Sources

External links
Westside Secondary School
Upper Grand District School Board

Orangeville, Ontario
High schools in Dufferin County
1999 establishments in Ontario
Educational institutions established in 1999